The Mitchell House is a historic house at 115 North Nelson in Gentry, Arkansas.  Built in 1927, it is the finest local example of Craftsman architecture.  It is a -story wood-frame structure, with a side-gable roof that extends over the front porch.  The roof's wide eaves and porch area have exposed rafter ends and large brackets typical of the style, and there are wide shed roof dormers at the front and rear.

The house was listed on the National Register of Historic Places in 1988.

See also
Mitchell–Ward House (Gentry, Arkansas)
National Register of Historic Places listings in Benton County, Arkansas

References

Houses on the National Register of Historic Places in Arkansas
Houses completed in 1927
Houses in Benton County, Arkansas
National Register of Historic Places in Benton County, Arkansas
1927 establishments in Arkansas
American Craftsman architecture in Arkansas
Bungalow architecture in Arkansas
Gentry, Arkansas